The Papua New Guinea women's national basketball team is the women's national basketball team of Papua New Guinea. It is managed by the Basketball Federation of Papua New Guinea "BFPNG".

It has been the most successful team at the Pacific Games where it won the gold medal five times.

See also 
 Papua New Guinea women's national under-19 basketball team
 Papua New Guinea women's national under-17 basketball team
 Papua New Guinea women's national 3x3 team

References

External links
Papua New Guinea Basketball Records at FIBA Archive
Basketball Federation of Papua New Guinea Basketball - facebook presentation
Papua New Guinea National Team at australiabasket.com

Women's national basketball teams
Basketball in Papua New Guinea
Basketball teams in Papua New Guinea
National sports teams of Papua New Guinea